Violeta Friedman (1930–2000) was a Jewish Holocaust survivor, activist, and author born in Marghita, Romania. In 1985, she sued Léon Degrelle, former leader of the Belgian fascist party Rex and Holocaust denier, for claiming that Josef Mengele, the SS officer stationed at Auschwitz who had ordered the gassing of Friedman's family, was an ordinary doctor and that no gas chambers existed at Auschwitz. In 1995 Friedman published a book titled Mis memorias (My Memories). 

Friedman died in Madrid on 30 October 2000.

References

Sources
 
 
 

Auschwitz concentration camp survivors
Romanian expatriates in Spain
Romanian Jews
Romanian memoirists
1930 births
2000 deaths
People from Marghita
Women memoirists
20th-century Romanian women writers
20th-century memoirists